Ilyachevo (İläs) is a rural locality (a village) in Novozirgansky Selsoviet, Khaybullinsky District, Bashkortostan, Russia. The population was 359 as of 2010. There are 5 streets.

Geography 
Ilyachevo is located 18 km south of Akyar (the district's administrative centre) by road. Stepnoy is the nearest rural locality.

References 

Rural localities in Khaybullinsky District